Pełczyce  is a village in the administrative district of Gmina Bogoria, within Staszów County, Świętokrzyskie Voivodeship, in south-central Poland.

The village has a population of  384.

Demography 
According to the 2002 Poland census, there were 370 people residing in Pełczyce village, of whom 50% were male and 50% were female. In the village, the population was spread out, with 24.6% under the age of 18, 31.9% from 18 to 44, 19.2% from 45 to 64, and 24.3% who were 65 years of age or older.
 Figure 1. Population pyramid of village in 2002 – by age group and sex

References

Villages in Staszów County